Sergey Osipyan (born September 15, 1966) is a Russian film director, screenwriter and producer.

Biography
Sergey was born on September 15, 1966. He studied at the Higher Courses for Scriptwriters and Directors in the workshop of Alexander Kaidanovsky.

Filmography
 Yavleniye prirody (2010)
 Guys from MarsЕсть ли жизнь на "MarZe"? (2011)
 Otkroveniya (2019)
 Portrait of a Stranger'' (2021)

References

External links 
 
 Sergey Osipyan on kino-teatr.ru

Living people
Russian film directors
1966 births